Gokulam Kerala FC Women is an Indian women's football section of Gokulam Kerala FC, based in Calicut, Kerala. They participated in Indian Women's League, the women's premier football league in India. 
They won the first IWL In 2019–20. They then retained the title in 2021–22.
In 2021, they became the first club to represent India in AFC Women's Club Championship.

Crest

The club logo incorporates elements from historical Theyyam, a famous ritual art form that originated in northern Kerala. It encompasses dance, mime and music.

Stadium

Gokulam Kerala Women plays most of its home matches at the EMS Stadium, which is located in the heart of Calicut city. West stand is the largest block and can accommodate most spectators. Currently the capacity of the stadium is limited to 80,000.

Technical staff

Current squad

Performance in AFC competitions

AFC Women's Club Championship
Winner of the 2020–21 Indian Women's League season would originally get the chance to participate in 2021 edition of AFC Women's Club Championship. As a backup, if the season is unable to complete, defending champions of 2019–20 season, Gokulam Kerala FC, will qualify for the event. Later, on 15 July 2021, the All India Football Federation (AIFF) nominated Gokulam Kerala to represent India in the AFC Women's Club Championship 2020–21 pilot tournament.

Honours

Continental
 AFC Women's Club Championship
 Third place (1): 2021

Domestic
 Indian Women's League
 Champions (2): 2019–20, 2021–22

 Kerala Women's League
 Champions (1): 2021–22
 Runners-up (1): 2022–23

References

External links 

Gokulam Kerala FC
Indian Women's League clubs
Women's football clubs in India
Sport in Kozhikode
Football clubs in Kerala
2018 establishments in Kerala
Association football clubs established in 2018